Chief Hosea Katjikururume Komombumbi Kutako (1870 – 18 July 1970), was an early Namibian nationalist leader and a founder member of Namibia's first nationalist party, the South West African National Union (SWANU). 

"During  his  life,  he  experienced  the  transition  from  independence  to  colonization,  and  the  destruction  of  Herero  society  and  the  loss  of  its  lands,  although he struggled to regain the freedom and self-determination that he and his society had previously known. Initially Kutako campaigned only for his own people, yet at a very early stage he began campaigning for the freedom and self-determination  of  all  the  inhabitants  of  Namibia.  In  this,  Hosea  Kutako  can  be  described as the country’s first truly nationalist politician, a man who strove for the greater good not only for himself but for all. Hosea Kutako was born as a Herero royal, but into a position which, but for the course of history, would never have enabled him to claim leadership of the Herero, let alone of the people of Namibia" Jan-Brand Gewald

Early life
Hosea Komombumbi Kutako was born in 1870 at Okahurimehi, near Kalkfeld.

Career and achievements

In 1920, Hosea Kutako was officially appointed as leader of the Herero people by Frederik Maharero. Mahahero had been empowered to transfer power by his father, Herero chief Samuel Maharero, who had been exiled after the Herero War and was since banned from entering the country by the South African Mandatory Administration. Hosea Kutako took over his role as a commitment to preserve the memory of the Herero before and during the German colonisation as well as of the Battle of Waterberg. The aftermath of this battle was recognised in 2004 by Heidemarie Wieczorek-Zeul, Germany's development aid minister, as being equivalent to genocide. 

The seat of his Kutako's chieftaincy was situated at the settlement of Toasis in the Aminuis area.

Also in 1920, he founded the Green Flags, an association to keep up tradition, and went on by founding the Red Flags in 1923, after Samuel Maharero’s death. Kutako prompted and organised the transfer of Samuel Maharero’s body and its funeral on Okahandja next to the grave of Jonker Afrikaner. Kutako also founded the Truppenspieler association. It was intended to attain military importance, but this was opposed both by the South African authorities and by Sam Nujoma, the co-founder of the South West African People's Organisation SWAPO. So, the Truppenspieler had to content themselves with an accompanying role at Herero Day.

Kutako became deputy chief of Namibia's Traditional Leaders Council, and also became Chief of the Botswana Mbanderu people in 1951. Along with the British Anglican priest Rev. Michael Scott, he submitted numerous petitions to the United Nations during the 1950s and 1960s calling on the world body to end South African rule and grant Namibia independence. This eventually led to the UN's recognition of Namibia as a sovereign country under colonial administration by South Africa and the historic 1971 advisory opinion of the International Court of Justice that South Africa's continued administration of Namibia was illegal in terms of international law. Hosea Kutako is considered a national hero in Namibia.

He died on 18 July 1970 in the Aminuis Reserve, in the remote eastern part of the Omaheke Region of Namibia.

Recognition
Hosea Kutako is one of nine national heroes of Namibia that were identified at the inauguration of the country's Heroes' Acre near Windhoek. Founding president Sam Nujoma remarked in his inauguration speech on 26 August 2002 that:
Chief Hosea Komombumbi Kutako [...] participated on the anti colonial wars of 1904 as one of the leading commanders. He also played an historic and significant role in petitioning the United Nations Organisation demanding the placement of the then South West Africa under the United Nations trusteeship system. [...] In this 
way, he played a major role in Namibia's struggle for freedom and independence. To his revolutionary spirit and his visionary memory we humbly offer our honor and respect.
Kutako is honoured in form of a granite tombstone with his name engraved and his portrait plastered onto the slab.

Windhoek's international airport, the country's primary international airport, is named after him.

In July 2010, Kutako's former home in the Omaheke Region was nominated by the Omaheke Regional Council to become a national heritage site.

References

Further reading
 Kutako's memory cast in bronze  The Namibian, 12 June 1998
 Note: This is a self-published source, so may not meet high standards of reliability.

1870 births
1970 deaths
People from Otjozondjupa Region
Herero people
SWANU politicians
SWAPO politicians
National heroes of Namibia
Namibian centenarians
Namibian revolutionaries
Men centenarians